William Edwin "Ed" Berrett (June 2, 1902 – November 30, 1993) was a Vice President of Brigham Young University (BYU) and a Latter-day Saint author.

Biography
Berrett was raised in southern Salt Lake County in what is today Cottonwood Heights, Utah. He attended Jordan High School. He received his undergraduate education from the University of Utah.  Berrett graduated from there in 1924 and then worked for a time as the principal of the LDS seminary in Roosevelt, Utah.  He received a law degree from the University of Utah in 1933. He also did graduate studies at BYU from 1927 to 1933. In 1926, Berrett married Eleanore Louise Callister in the Salt Lake Temple.

By 1936, Berrett began writing text books to be used in the LDS schools and was an editor for the Church Educational System's curriculum development. Berrett's most notable work was The Restored Church, a text to teach the history of the Church of Jesus Christ of Latter-day Saints (LDS Church); the book went through at least 16 editions.  He also compiled with Alma Burton Readings in LDS Church History.

In 1943, Berrett was appointed special prosecutor for the Office of Price Administration for the Utah Division. In 1946, he became an assistant U.S. attorney in Alaska Territory. He left government employment in 1947 and became a lawyer in private practice in Salt Lake City. He also was on the editorial staff of the Deseret News.

From 1935 to 1953 Berrett was a member of the Deseret Sunday School Union General Board.

In 1947, Berrett joined the BYU faculty as a professor of Church History. In 1951, he was one of the key figures in getting an ROTC unit located at BYU. He also worked closely with Ernest L. Wilkinson in recruiting more faculty to BYU. In 1953, Berrett was appointed vice president of both BYU and the Church Educational System.

From 1962 to 1965 Berrett served as chairman of the Utah Committee on Children and Youth.

In 1965, the Seminary and Institute programs of the LDS Church were separated from the BYU administration. Berrett was appointed head of Seminaries, Institutes and all Church-run colleges and schools (other than BYU). In 1972, Berrett retired and worked on writing a three-volume history of the Church Educational System. This was not published, but was later re-worked into a one-volume history published in 1988 as A Miracle in Week-day Religious Education.

Berrett and his wife Eleanor had four children.

For the last two decades or so of his life, Berrett served as a patriarch in the LDS Church.  In his book titled 'The Church and the Negroid People', pages 16–17, he expresses his opinions on African-Americans that may sound offensive to a 21st-century reader.

References

Wilkinson, Ernest L., ed., Brigham Young University: The First 100 Years. (Provo: BYU Press, 1975) p. 470-472.
Deseret News, Dec. 2, 1993, obituary.

External links
 William E. Berrett papers, MSS 1955 at the L. Tom Perry Special Collections, Harold B. Lee Library, Brigham Young University

1902 births
People from Midvale, Utah
American Latter Day Saint writers
Church Educational System instructors
University of Utah alumni
Brigham Young University alumni
Brigham Young University faculty
Patriarchs (LDS Church)
1993 deaths
Sunday School (LDS Church) people
American leaders of the Church of Jesus Christ of Latter-day Saints
20th-century American writers
Latter Day Saints from Utah